Turck is a German manufacturer in the industrial automation sector. The sensor, fieldbus, interface and connection technology provider is represented worldwide with around 4650 employees in more than 30 subsidiaries and sales partners in a further 60 countries.

Organization 
The Turck Group is mainly managed by the two companies Hans Turck GmbH & Co. KG in Mülheim an der Ruhr - responsible for sales and marketing - and Werner Turck GmbH & Co. KG in Halver - responsible for development and production. The managing directors of Hans Turck GmbH & Co. KG are Christian Wolf and Christian Pauli. Werner Turck GmbH. Co KG has been managed by Michael Gröbner since December 2019. The Turck Group is mainly managed by the two companies Hans Turck GmbH & Co. KG in Mülheim an der Ruhr - responsible for sales and marketing - and Werner Turck GmbH & Co. KG in Halver - responsible for development and production. The managing directors of Hans Turck GmbH & Co. KG are Christian Wolf and Christian Pauli. Werner Turck GmbH. Co KG has been managed by Michael Gröbner since December 2019. 

In addition to the total of four locations in Germany, more than 30 other independent subsidiaries belong to the Turck Group worldwide. The largest locations include the subsidiaries in the USA (Turck Inc. in Minneapolis) and China (Turck Tianjin Sensor Co., Ltd.).

History 
At the beginning of the 1960s, the brothers Hans and Werner Turck founded the company, starting off with two employees, a seed capital of 20,000 German Marks and the idea of automating manufacturing processes through electronic components. Shortly after, their partner Hermann Hermes joined the young company.

Turck's early international orientation dates back to 1975, which was marked by the foundation of Turck Inc. in Minneapolis, USA. Turck took over a measuring instrument factory in 1989, based in Beierfeld, Saxony, and thus entered into East European markets. A sales and production company was founded in 1995 in Tianjin, China, for the Asian market.

On 10 July 2015, barely three months after Werner Turck, his brother Hans Turck passed away as the second founder of the company.

Products 
The automation supplier's product portfolio includes around 15,000 products from the fields of sensor and connection technology as well as fieldbus and interface technology. In addition to individual components for machine builders and end users - such as sensors, remote I/O stations or quick connectors - Turck also offers systems for image processing, radio frequency identification (RFID) or pick-to-light applications.

References 

Manufacturing companies of Germany
German brands